Robert M. Torrance (born 1939) is Professor Emeritus of Comparative Literature at UC Davis.

Torrance received his B.A. from Harvard in Greek and English, his M.A. at UC Berkeley in Comparative Literature, and his Ph.D. at Harvard in Comparative Literature. After teaching at Harvard and at Brooklyn College of CUNY, he moved to UC Davis in 1976. During his 25 years at Davis, he served several terms as both director  and graduate adviser.

Bibliography
 Sophocles "The Women of Trachis" and "Philoctetes": A New Verse Translation, Houghton-Mifflin (1966). 
 The Comic Hero, Harvard University Press (1978) 
 Ideal and Spleen: The Crisis of Transcendent Vision in Romantic, Symbolist, and Modern Poetry, Garland (1987) 
 Encompassing Nature: A Sourcebook  (editor), Counterpoint (1998) 
 The Spiritual Quest: Transcendence in Myth, Religion, and Science, University of California Press (1994)  
 Dante's Inferno, A New Translation in Terza Rima, X-libris (2011)

References

Living people
American literary critics
Harvard University alumni
UC Berkeley College of Letters and Science alumni
University of California, Davis faculty
1939 births
Brooklyn College faculty